Cover Girl is a Canadian French language television sitcom, which aired on Radio-Canada in 2005. Created and written by Richard Blaimert, the series revolved around three drag queens sharing ownership of Cover Girl, a gay nightclub and drag cabaret in downtown Montreal.

The series premiered in the winter of the 2004-05 television season, and was renewed for a second season which aired in fall 2005, for a total of 26 episodes. One of Quebec's most noted drag queens, Mado Lamotte, criticized the show as unrealistic.

The series garnered several Gemeaux Award nominations in 2006, including Best Comedy Series and nods for René Richard Cyr and Vincent Bolduc as Best Actor in a Comedy Series.

Cast
 René Richard Cyr - Mathieu Picard/Veronica Sinclair
 Vincent Bolduc - Justin Pearson-Faucher-Brodeur/Joujou Velcro
 Frédéric Pierre - Newton da Costa/Lana Brown
 Gilles Renaud - Cherry Sundae
 Suzanne Clément - Camille Langlois
 Stéphane Demers - David
 Anne-Marie Cadieux - Brenda Lepine
 Patrick Huard - Norma Champaine

References

External links
 

Ici Radio-Canada Télé original programming
2005 Canadian television series debuts
2005 Canadian television series endings
2000s Canadian LGBT-related comedy television series
Television shows set in Montreal
2000s Canadian sitcoms
2000s LGBT-related sitcoms
Drag (clothing) television shows
Canadian LGBT-related sitcoms